Lawrence R. Hawkins (April 21, 1943 – December 29, 2016) was an American politician. He served as a Democratic member for the 119th district of the Florida House of Representatives.

Hawkins was born in Detroit, Michigan, the son of Carolyn and Roy Hawkins. He attended Eastern Michigan University, where he graduated in 1966 with a Bachelor of Science degree. Hawkins enlisted in the United States Army, where he served as a Second lieutenant from 1967. He was sent to Vietnam, where he earned the Bronze Star Medal and Purple Heart, receiving injuries which left him paraplegic. After being discharged, Hawkins attended Wayne State University Law School, where he earned a Juris Doctor degree.

In 1978, he was elected for the 119th district of the Florida House of Representatives, serving until 1986. Hawkins then served as Dade County Commissioner from 1988 to 1994. He was also on the board of the Vietnam Veterans of America. Hawkins worked with lawyer, author and politician Tom Harkin.

Hawkins died in December 2016, at the age of 73. He was buried in Arlington National Cemetery.

References 

1943 births
2016 deaths
Democratic Party members of the Florida House of Representatives
20th-century American politicians
Eastern Michigan University alumni
Wayne State University Law School alumni
Purple Heart
Burials at Arlington National Cemetery